Eugoa hectogamoides is a moth of the family Erebidae first described by Jeremy Daniel Holloway in 2001. It is found on Borneo. The habitat consists of alluvial forests.

The length of the forewings is 8 mm. The ground colour is pale straw.

References

Moths described in 2001
hectogamoides